Colonia San José may refer to:

Colonia San José, Chihuahua, Mexico
Colonia San José, Jujuy, Argentina
Colonia San José, La Pampa, Argentina

See also
San José (disambiguation)